Gasoline Alley is a comic strip by Frank King, first published in 1918

Gasoline Alley may also refer to:

Places

Canada 
 Gasoline Alley, Alberta, a business park in Red Deer County, Alberta, Canada
 Gasoline Alley, Alberta (hamlet), a hamlet in Red Deer County, Alberta, Canada
 Gasoline Alley Museum, an antique car and memorabilia museum located within Heritage Park Historical Village in Calgary, Alberta

United States 
 Gasoline Alley (Indianapolis Motor Speedway), the garage area at the Indianapolis Motor Speedway

Arts, entertainment, and media 
 Gasoline Alley (1951 film), an American comedy film
 Corky of Gasoline Alley, its sequel released the same year
 Gasoline Alley (2022 film), an American action thriller film
 Gasoline Alley (album), a 1970 album by Rod Stewart, or the title track
 Gasoline Alley (radio), a 193149 radio series based on the eponymous comic strip

See also 
The Talk of Gasoline Alley